"Johnny Roach" is an American song written by blackface minstrel composer Dan Emmett. The song was first published in 1859. The lyrics tell of a slave who has escaped to the Northern United States, who laments his lost plantation house and realizes that he really belongs in the South:

The song is notable for being the first printed reference to the South as "Dixie's Land":

A portion of the chorus was repeated in "Dixie" with slight variation.

References

Nathan, Hans (1962). Dan Emmett and the Rise of Early Negro Minstrelsy. Norman: University of Oklahoma Press.

Blackface minstrel songs
1859 songs